Ronald Villalba (born 13 July 1983 in San Lorenzo, Paraguay) is a Paraguayan footballer currently playing for Tacuary of the Primera División in Paraguay.

Teams
  Olimpia 2004
  General Caballero 2005
  12 de Octubre 2006
  Sportivo Trinidense 2007
  Sportivo Luqueño 2007
  Deportivo Azogues 2008
  Deportes La Serena 2009–2010
  Tacuary 2010–present

References
 

1983 births
Living people
Paraguayan footballers
Paraguayan expatriate footballers
General Caballero Sport Club footballers
Sportivo Trinidense footballers
12 de Octubre Football Club players
Club Olimpia footballers
Sportivo Luqueño players
Deportes La Serena footballers
Expatriate footballers in Chile
Expatriate footballers in Ecuador
Association footballers not categorized by position